"Working for the Man" is a song composed and sung by rock and roll performer Roy Orbison. Released in 1962 as a double A-side with "Leah", it reached number one in Australia, number thirty-three in the US, and the top 50 in Canada and England.

Details
"Working for the Man" and "Leah" were both recorded on August 14, 1962. It was the first release after the dissolution of Orbison's writing partnership with Joe Melson. In many releases it was subtitled, "with Bob Moore's Orchestra and Chorus".

"Working for the Man" was inspired by Orbison's time after school. He said, "I was working for El Paso Natural Gas in the daytime, cutting up steel and loading it onto trucks and chopping weeds and painting water towers. Our straw boss was Mr. Rose, and he wouldn’t cut me any slack." Elsewhere he added, "I worked in the blazing heat, hard, hard labor, and then I’d play at night, come home and some nights be too tired to eat or even to undress. I’d lay down, and I wouldn’t even turn over. I’d wake up in the same spot and hit the oil patch again." He added, "Most of the songs I've written are based on experiences I recall. It may be some years after a thing has happened to me that I'll think about it and then write a song."

Reception
At the time of release, Billboard noted "Working for the Man" was a "fine song" and "a smartly styled work song that reached a powerful climax". The BBC noted, " Orbison could be playful. The yodelling, gleeful "Working for the Man" is a double-edged paean to hard-nosed capitalism."

Mental as Anything version

Australian band Mental as Anything released the song as a non-album single in November 1983. It peaked at number 20 in Australia and 49 in New Zealand. It was subsequently added to the North American version of Creatures of Leisure.

Track listings

Charts

References

1962 songs
Roy Orbison songs
Mental As Anything songs
Regular Records singles
1983 singles
Songs written by Roy Orbison